Socket, known in Japan as , is a platform game developed and published by Vic Tokai for the Mega Drive/Genesis.

Reception
Diehard GameFan's reviewers gave Socket scores around 85% and praised its gameplay, graphics, and music.

The game has been criticized for too closely resembling Sonic the Hedgehog.

References

External links

1993 video games
Platform games
Science fiction video games
Sega Genesis games
Sega Genesis-only games
Side-scrolling video games
Vic Tokai games
Video games developed in Japan